Thomas Duffield (1782–1854) was a Tory politician.

Thomas Duffield may also refer to:

Thomas Duffield (academic), Master of University College, Oxford
Thomas Duffield (died 1579) (1493–1579), MP for East Grinstead